Tamworth Regional Entertainment Conference Centre (TRECC) is an Australian arena, located approximately 6 km south of the Tamworth Central Business District, in the suburb of Hillvue and is within walking distance to good accommodation, retail and hospitality outlets.

It is a multi-purpose centre, offering separate break-out rooms and meeting areas off the main auditorium. It boasts superior audio and visual technology, catering and bar areas, green rooms and flexible stage configurations. TRECC seats up to 4,800 in full Concert Mode, 3,300 in Lyric Mode and 1,800 in Intimate Mode.

Centre uses
TRECC plays host to some spectacular shows including the Toyota Golden Guitar Awards – the Oscars of country music! In between awards nights, its home for everything from rock concerts to agricultural shows, car launches, home exhibitions and school spectaculars.

Other uses for the centre include:
 Concerts
 Theatrical Productions
 Trade Shows, Exhibitions and Product Launches
 Educational exhibitions
 Markets/Fairs
 Major event Dinners/Functions
 Conferences
 Indoor sporting events
 Community events
 Charity events

Centre history
The construction of a large event centre capable of housing a variety of functions on a year-round basis and providing a facility capable of hosting Award ceremonies and concerts associated with the Annual Tamworth Country Music Festival has been on the “drawing boards” in Tamworth for at least 20 years.

Tamworth City Council has decided to construct the Tamworth Regional Exhibition Centre as community owned asset.

The Tamworth Regional Entertainment & Conference Centre has been designed to provide a venue suitable for the staging of multiplicity of large major events, including indoor sports events of an international standard. 

The Tamworth Regional Entertainment Conference Centre was officially opened on Friday 22 January 1999 at 11:00am at an opening ceremony held in the centre forecourt.

Concerts and events
Artists that have performed at TREC include Bob Dylan, Dolly Parton, Cold Chisel, The Seekers, Leo Sayer, Silverchair, Powderfinger & Missy Higgins, among others.

Australian bands Silverchair & Powderfinger played at the Centre, on 4 September 2007, during their Across the Great Divide Tour, in front of a crowd of 4,500 people.

Other events
 2008 Young Drivers Expo
 Arrive Alive Eastern University Games
 Australian Idol
 Capers School Spectacular
 Catholic Schools Celebrate
 Case IH Product Launch
 Cold Chisel
 Concert of the Century
 Country Energy – Conference
 Doobie Bros
 Drums Tao – Unrivalled Drumming Spectacular
 Dwight Yoakam
 Energy Safety Solutions Exhibition & Competition
 Food Services Industry & Exhibition
 Jayco Australia/CMAA Country Music Awards of Australia
 Jehovah Witness Annual Convention
 Leo Sayer
 Local Government Stores Suppliers Exhibition
 Longway to the Top
 Livestock & Bulk Carriers Association – Conference & Exhibition
 Hats Off to Slim Dusty
 Harlem Gospel Choir
 Home & Leisure Shows
 Annual Jehovah's Witness District Convention
 Namoi Landcare Forum
 National MG Car Club Rally
 National View Club Conference
 North West Dance Festival
 NSW Country Gymnastics Championships
 Pink Floyd Tribute
 Rotary District Conference & Dinner
 Rural Critical Care Conference
 School Presentations & Formals
 Shell Rimula Rig of the Year
 Silverchair & Powerfinger Tour
 75th Anniversary Sydney Symphony Orchestra Concert
 The Seekers
 Toyota Country Theatre featuring Troy Cassar-Daley, Sara Storer, John Williamson, Melinda Schnieder, Colin Buchanan, Adam Brand, Gina Jeffreys and more!
 Tamworth & District Chamber of Commerce & Industry Business Awards
 Uniting Church Synod Conference & Dinner
 Westpac Helicopter Annual Ball & Auction
 Willie Nelson In Concert
 Dolly Parton

References

External links
 - 

Indoor arenas in Australia
Buildings and structures in Tamworth, New South Wales
New England (New South Wales)
Music venues in Australia